The Dewey–Stassen debate was the first audio-recorded presidential debate in the United States. It featured New York Governor Thomas E. Dewey and former Minnesota Governor Harold Stassen discussing the legal status of the Communist Party of the United States four days before the 1948 Oregon Republican presidential primary. The debate was transmitted throughout the nation via radio broadcast, and is credited with helping Dewey win the primary and the nomination of his party. It is often cited as establishing the modern presidential debate standard.

Background
Dewey was the presidential nominee of the Republican Party in 1944, but was defeated by President Franklin D. Roosevelt. In 1948, he was considered the frontrunner for the nomination, but was surprised by the dark horse Stassen, who came seemingly from nowhere to win primaries in Wisconsin and Nebraska. Stassen had been Governor of Minnesota from 1939 to 1943, and served in the United States Navy during World War II. He led Dewey in the polls at the time of the debate, and considered pulling the plug on the idea, until it was assessed that the move could negatively affect his campaign.

Although it is believed that Stassen challenged Dewey to the debate, Peter H. Odegard, the president of Reed College officially proposed the idea of a radio broadcast to the candidates. Dewey chose the topic: "Shall the Communist Party be outlawed?" At the time, the capitalist United States was embroiled in a Cold War with the communist Soviet Union. The operation of the Cold War had become an election issue, as well as the question of how communism should be dealt with inside the nation. Stassen who was considered a liberal held the affirmative position, while Dewey argued the negative.

The debate

The debate was held on May 17, 1948 and was moderated by the chairman of the Multnomah County Republican Central Committee, Donald R. Van Boskirk. It is estimated that 40 million people listened to the debate. It was carried by the radio stations of ABC (produced by the Portland affiliate KEX), MBS and NBC, but was not broadcast by CBS. 56 active reporters were present during the debate and sat behind a glass shield to take notes.

Stassen began with a 20-minute opening that described what he hoped to accomplish unhindered, but mentioned that these goals were threatened by the spread of Communism. He depicted the totalitarian aspects of Communism that he witnessed overseas, using the coup d'état in Czechoslovakia as an example. He then connected the Communist Party of the United States directly to Moscow, and used this to defend his support of the Nixon-Mundt Bill, introduced to the Senate by Senators Karl Earl Mundt of South Dakota and Richard Nixon of California, which he believed would effectively outlaw the Communist Party. Stassen also attacked Dewey directly, commenting that there was a growing presence of Communists in New York.

In a 20-minute response, Dewey criticized Stassen's position, commented that "you can't shoot an idea with a gun." He remarked that a criminalization of the party would itself be totalitarian, and would advance the cause, arguing that it would be best to keep the movement in the light of day to counter the ideas in public discourse, and that efforts to outlaw the Communist Party of Canada by the Canadian government, had failed. He also questioned Stassen's understanding of the Mundt bill, informing the audience that it would not outlaw the Communist Party as stated by Mundt himself, but would put restrictions on their activities. Dewey defended himself against Stassen's claims about his state by attempting to minimize the issue.

Stassen and Dewey each had an 8.5 minute rebuttal following Dewey's response. Both tried to convince the audience that they had won the debate since the other supported the bill, which effectively conceded their view. Stassen held that the bill would effectively ban the party, but Dewey commented that only two people held that particular position: Stassen and the leader of the Communist Party.

Aftermath
Dewey was considered the winner of the debate and won the primary in Oregon on May 21. At the Republican convention, Dewey won the nomination of his party. Despite the infamous Dewey Defeats Truman headline, he lost the general election to President Harry Truman, and died in 1971. Stassen became a perennial presidential candidate, running for the Republican nomination at least ten more times until his death in 2001.

The presidential debate has since become a cornerstone of presidential elections since the first televised debate in 1960. At least one has been held in every presidential election since 1976.

References

External links
University of Rochester: Dewey-Stassen Debate

United States presidential debates
1948 in the United States
1948 United States presidential election
Cold War history of the United States
American radio programs
Republican Party presidential debates
May 1948 events in the United States